is an ongoing Japanese manga series by Yuki Midorikawa. It began serialization by Hakusensha in the shōjo manga magazine LaLa DX in 2005, before switching to LaLa in 2008. The chapters and special chapters have been collected in twenty-nine bound volumes so far. 

The series is about Takashi Natsume, a sixteen to seventeen-year-old orphaned teenage boy who can see spirits, and one day finds the notebook that his late mysterious maternal grandmother Reiko Natsume, who was known to possess infinitely strong spiritual powers, in addition to being exceptionally beautiful (both of which her one and only descendant and grandchild had clearly inherited), used to bind dozens of powerful demonic spirits both good and evil (known as either ayakashi or yokai) that she defeated to follow her very whim and desire if called upon. He thus resolves to give back all the names in the age-old notebook, and in the process joins forces with another feline/wolf-like spirit called Madara (nicknamed "Master Kitty-Cat/Nyanko-Sensei" in his borrowed lucky cat-like form) who knew Reiko when she was still alive. He takes the form of an overweight cat and intends to take back the notebook after Natsume dies. Until then he agreed to protect Natsume from the nefarious spirits who want to harm him for being the grandson of the infamous miko and exorcist Natsume Reiko. Natsume's Book of Friends was a finalist for the first Manga Taishō award in 2008.

Natsume's Book of Friends has been adapted as a series of drama CDs, as well as an anime television series produced by Brain's Base (seasons 1–4) and Shuka (seasons 5–6), which was broadcast on TV Tokyo for 6 seasons in 2008, 2009, 2011, 2012, 2016 and 2017. The manga is licensed for English-language release in North America by Viz Media, which released the first volume in January 2010.

The first four seasons of the anime have been licensed by NIS America for a North American release in 2012. A fifth season began airing on October 4, 2016. A sixth season began airing on April 11, 2017.

Natsume's Book of Friends the Movie: Ephemeral Bond was released in theaters on September 29, 2018.

A new film of two special episodes titled Natsume's Book of Friends: The Waking Rock and the Strange Visitor was released in theaters on January 16, 2021.

Story
For as long as he can remember, Natsume Takashi has had the rare ability to see and commune with spirits, inheriting the power from his maternal grandmother Natsume Reiko. This ability resulted in his having a lonely childhood because children his age considered him strange. He had also been passed from one paternal relative to another. Upon her death, Reiko bequeathed to her grandson her Book of Friends, a book containing the names of spirits she had bullied into servitude.

The Book of Friends is considered a highly prized item in the spirit world, and spirits -both good and malicious – haunt Takashi constantly because of it. Takashi spends his time dissolving the contracts that Reiko created and releasing the various spirits that come to him for help. Malicious spirits on the other hand try to kill him to obtain possession of the book, which is where Madara (called Nyanko-sensei by Natsume) comes in. Madara serves as Natsume's bodyguard and spiritual advisor of sorts, even though ostensibly he is motivated by his own desire to possess the Book of Friends. He later begins to become more attached to Takashi, with the latter forming a similar bond with Madara.

Characters

Main characters
 

 Takashi Natsume, like his deceased maternal grandmother Natsume Reiko, is able to see ayakashi/yokai (i.e., "spirits"; the anime/manga often uses the two terms interchangeably). It is from Reiko that Takashi inherited the "Book of Friends" – a ledger of names written by ayakashi after being bested by Reiko in some type of contest. Because possession of an ayakashi'''s false name obliges it to heed any command of the one who has the book, the abuse potential of the Book of Friends is vast: and as such, is largely considered too powerful and forbidden to actually really exist.
 Because of Takashi's strong resemblance to Reiko (both in appearance and immensely strong spiritual powers), yokai routinely mistake Natsume for his grandmother, often pursuing him intensely, under the mistaken presumption of shared history and understanding. Accordingly, a regular part of Natsume's daily life is spent trying to cope with the idiosyncrasies, and discern the true intentions of such yokai: e.g., those who still deeply resent Reiko, but covet the great power of the Book of Friends to bend hundreds of yokai to their will; those who feel lonely and hurt that Reiko never called upon them anymore; those who simply want their names returned to them; and pretty much anywhere or everywhere in between. Upon discovering the Book of Friends, Natsume – kindly but detached in demeanor, driven in equal parts by curiousness and conscientiousness – decided to take responsibility on his own terms, to return the names of the dozens of ayakashi to their owners himself: and in doing so, learn more about his maternal grandmother and the spiritual connection they shared. He is aided in this by the formidable yokai Madara (whom he calls "Nyanko-sensei": a nod to both his usual cat-like appearance and his self-proclaimed job-title of "bodyguard"), to whom he has promised the Book of Friends should he die.
 Natsume is an orphan; his mother (Reiko's illegitimate daughter) having died giving birth to him sixteen years ago, and his father died when he was a very young child, leaving him to be passed from distant paternal relative to paternal relative: in large part due to the "odd" or "creepy" behavior one might expect from a young child able to see creatures no one else could see. Behind Natsume's perpetual distant smile hides a childhood spent in constant anxiety and shame: borne in equal parts of the ayakashi and the people who called him a liar and attention-seeker because of them. Natsume is eventually passed on to the Fujiwaras, a middle-aged couple on his late father's side of the family. He loves them, and does not want to cause them trouble, so he keeps this 'alternate landscape' problem to himself. Being the only grandchild and descendant of the infamous Reiko, his innate spiritual powers are quite immense, allowing him to actually incapacitate and/or purify yokai with one punch alone, as well figure out if a human is possessed.
 Natsume is described by Yuki Midorikawa as "a boy who is trying to be a kind person."
 Natsume returns the name inscribed in the Book of Friends by first picturing the ayakashi in his mind. The book flips to the page on which the name is written and Natsume takes the page and places it in his mouth and exhales. Natsume is only able to do this because he is Reiko's only direct descendant. The cost of releasing the name, however, is that Natsume's spiritual energy is drained temporarily. If an ayakashi becomes emotionally unstable, in the same space as a sleeping Natsume its dreams may flow into Natsume's.
 On the other hand, most of the ayakashi let Natsume see into their memories, so that he can understand them and his long deceased grandmother better. Natsume can also see their memories when he releases a yokai's name, seeing their last encounter with a teenage Natsume Reiko. When Natsume is completely frustrated over a problem and falls asleep in class, he actually sleep-draws in his notebook about whatever is bothering him at the time. When he was being chased by a shadow he called "Mary", he started drawing it in his sleep, making his friends wonder if he was in love with a foreigner. His incredibly strong ability in exorcist spells and immensely powerful spiritual strength causes him to smell "yummy" to man-eating yokai, as Madara puts it for Takashi having Reiko's scent as well as her great looks.
 Natsume's ever developing/increasing spiritual powers and his keen sixth sense regarding yokai leave him targeted by yokai and wanted by exorcists. At the beginning, Natori wants him to join his exorcist clan, but later prefers him as a good friend. Seiji Matoba, one of the strongest and most dangerous of exorcists, also tries to recruit Natsume, but for his nefarious intent for being related to the notoriously powerful exorcist Natsume Reiko.
  

 A mysterious inugami. Madara was sealed in a shrine until he was accidentally released by Natsume. Because Madara was trapped in a material form for so long, Madara ordinarily takes on the shape of a maneki neko (lucky cat), leading Natsume to nickname him Nyanko-sensei. In this form, other people can see him, leading for Natsume having to ask his guardians if he could keep him as a pet. He is a powerful ayakashi, who protects Natsume from others and teaches him spells on occasion, in return for Natsume's promise to give him the Book of Friends when he dies, so Madara often complains when Natsume returns other yokai's names, saying that at this rate there will be nothing left in the Book when Natsume dies. They often fight each other, which leads to Natsume punching Madara on the face and knocking him out. But as the story progresses, Madara takes a liking to Natsume. Despite his protests of not being a cat, he likes to play with cat toys. Nyanko's design is based on a lucky cat statue Midorikawa was given as a child. In the anime, Natsume is more respectful to Madara. 

Many times in the manga, other characters call Madara a 'pig' because of his round shape as a maneki neko, which annoys him greatly. Madara is implied to have had a close relationship with Natsume Reiko in both her teenage and young adult years til her premature death underneath a tree, which is implied to be one of the reasons he is content to be Takashi Natsume's yokai companion until the end of Natsume's own fleeting human life. Fans speculate that he may be Natsume's maternal grandfather but this has yet to be confirmed. 
 

 Natsume Takashi's maternal grandmother, from whom he inherited the rare spirtual ability to see and hear yokai as well as banish or seal them away. When Reiko was a teenager and young adult, she was considered a freak by everyone else because of her ability. Since she believed no human could ever understand her, she turned to the spirits for companionship. Reiko was extraordinarily powerful, and so she bullied spirits in to obeying her by playing games with them. If they lost, she would make them give her their names. Reiko gathered the false names in her magical Book of Friends, and commanded most spirits, excluding Madara. 

Madara mentions that she had sloppy table manners and was very forgetful. Reiko died when she was a young adult under a tree, either in her twenties or thirties, so no one remembered her, which was her what she had wanted. Her legacy and fame throughout the supernatural world still remains strong as her innate spiritual might was feared and greatly intriguing to both yokai and exorcists alike, which is why they are so interested in her grandchild who possesses the exact same exceptionally high level of spiritual power she possessed.

Supporting
 

 Another student that had recently moved into the area. He is sickly and quite susceptible to illnesses. Like Natsume, he is able to detect spirits, but to a lesser degree limited to seeing merely shadows and sensing slight presence of spirits. He wants to help Natsume in any way he can, but is afraid that he will just be a burden because of his weak ability. He became a close companion and even knew about Natsume's secret of seeing spirits and always helped him whenever he is in a tight spot.

 

 A new girl at school who rarely talks because of a curse a spirit has placed on her, which Natsume later helps her to break. She is an onmyouji; she cannot see spirits without drawing a magic circle. Taki, like Tanuma, wants to help Natsume in any way possible.

 

 The president of Natsume's homeroom. Sasada believes that Natsume can see spirits, although he repeatedly denies this to her. To Natsume's chagrin, she frequently tries to accompany him when he is on business involving spirits. She is a recurring character in the anime; in the manga, she is rarely seen after the encounter with Shigure due to transferring to another school from her step-father's job.

 

 A man who is also able to see spirits. He is a famous actor and exorcist and has a lizard birthmark that moves around on his body. He has the ability to manipulate paper dolls (Shikigami) and has three spirits under his command. Natsume tends to disapprove of his forceful exorcism methods. When Natori is first introduced, he hated spirits for his horrible childhood. But, after meeting Natsume, he gradually softens even though his ways aren't much different. Over the course, Natori develop concern for Natsume's well-being for he tends to be reckless when it involves with spirits.

 

 

 The head of the Matoba clan. A cold-hearted man, Seiji is an exorcist who doesn't mind sacrificing innocent youkai to reach his goals. Although he wants stronger youkai to protect humans, he will not hesitate in hurting anyone who gets in his way. He is mostly seen armed with a bow and arrow, which he uses to eliminate youkai. There is a scar on his right eye, covered by an eyepatch with a spell on it, due to a past member of the Matoba clan offering his eye to a youkai for assistance but ended up breaking his promise. This causes later heads of the clan to have their eye targeted by that youkai, and the distrust from other clans. After his first encounter with Natsume he takes great interest in him, and even later asks him to join the Matoba clan.

  

 Classmates of Natsume. Kitamoto is a sensible and rational person, while Nishimura is funny and easy-going, with a slightly perverted side. Although Natsume initially rejects their overtures of friendship because of his fears of his ability being found out, he eventually becomes friends with them, although they still hang around more with each other than Natsume. Nishimura has a crush on Taki, but thinks that she and Natsume are going out.

  

 A childless middle-aged couple and Natsume's current foster parents. Shigeru is a second cousin of Natsume's dead father, and as a boy once met Reiko without recognizing it was her. Both Touko and Shigeru assure Natsume that they consider him a part of their family. They both worry often about him, wanting him to be as happy as possible. Despite this, Natsume goes to great lengths to hide his ability from them. Slowly, Natsume comes to understand that his keeping the Fujiwaras at a distance, including always addressing them formally (see Honorific speech in Japanese), is preventing him from forming close human attachments. Despite this, he still fears being rejected because of his abilities.

  
 and Hiroshi Shimozaki

 

 A powerful youkai whose form is a blue-haired human woman. She is madly in love with Reiko Natsume. Being knowledgeable, she often acts as Takashi Natsume's mentor. Hinoe enjoys teasing Natsume and Madara; the former because of his unncanny resemblance to Reiko.

 

A huge powerful horse youkai with many followers. He acknowledges that Natsume Takashi is a worthy holder of the Book of Friends and offers himself as Natsume's bodyguard in place of the "useless" Madara.

 

 

 An orphaned fox youkai whose form is a boy with fox ears and tail however humans only see him as an infant fox. He becomes friends with Natsume after being rescued from bullying yokai.

 

Yokai
 

 

 

 

 

 

 

 

 

 

 
{{Voiced by|Mamiko Noto|Natalie Hoover

 

 

 

 

 

 

 

 

 

 

 

 

 

Humans
 

 

 

 

 

 

 

 

 

 Natsume's biological father who was deceased in Natsume's childhood.

Development
Midorikawa created Natsume's Book of Friends as an episodic serial for a manga magazine published every two months, so that each chapter was a story that could be read on its own. As the result of earlier writing a ghost story that an editor made her revise to include more romance than she initially wanted, Midorikawa specifically created Natsume's Book of Friends as a supernatural story with less romance, containing supernatural elements that stir readers' imaginations the way stories about yōkai and local gods stirred hers growing up in a rural area. For the basic story, she wanted to write about a boy and his non-human teacher, and include the incongruous element of the boy's grandmother in a school uniform.

This was the first series Midorikawa wrote in which the protagonist was also the central character. Midorikawa claimed that as a character Natsume is almost as bad as herself at expressing his thoughts, which caused her to use more interior monologue than she was comfortable with for a male character.

Media
MangaNatsume's Book of Friends is written and illustrated by Yuki Midorikawa and published in Japan by Hakusensha. It began serialization in 2005 in the bimonthly shōjo (aimed at teenage girls) manga magazine LaLa DX; in 2008, serialization switched to the monthly sister magazine LaLa. The untitled chapters have been collected in twenty-nine tankōbon volumes.

The series is licensed in English in North America by Viz Media, with the first volume published in January 2010. It is also licensed in French by Delcourt, in South Korea by Haksan, in Taiwan by Tong Li, in Thailand by Bongkoch Publishing, in Germany by Egmont Manga & Anime, in Italy by Panini Comics, in Indonesia by Elex Media Komputindo, in Vietnam by Tre Publishing House, in Russia by XL Media and in Poland by Studio JG.

In addition, a fan book was published on January 5, 2009 and a notebook reproduction of Natsume's Book of Friends was published on July 3, 2009.

Drama CDsNatsume's Book of Friends has been adapted as a series of three drama CDs, which were distributed as extras with issues of LaLa. 

 LaLa Treasure Drama CD (October 2007)
 LaLa Excellent Drama CD (November 2008)
 LaLa Double Premiere Drama CD (May 2009)

AnimeNatsume's Book of Friends has been adapted as an anime television series produced by Brain's Base, directed by Takahiro Omori. It was broadcast on the TV Tokyo network. Seasons 1 & 2 were released on five DVDs each.

The series is streamed online by Crunchyroll; episodes of the second season were available online on the day of broadcast.
NIS America has licensed the series for retail release in North America. NIS America later released the series from Volume 1 through Volume 3 alongside Natsume's Book of Friends seasons 1 and 2 on February 4, 2014.
It is also licensed in Chinese by Muse Communication.

The English dub premiered on Crunchyroll on July 24, 2022. The series is based on the first seventy-three chapters and several special chapters, which do not follow the order of the manga. Since the finale of the sixth season, fans are desperately awaiting subsequent seasons and movies once the manga is complete.

Films

Others
An OVA titled  was released on February 5, 2014, with the staff and cast of the previous anime seasons returning. The BD/DVD consisted of two discs, the second containing a clip of the "Sound Theatre x Natsume Yuujinchou ~ Tsudoi Ongeki no Shou~" musical event which was held the previous year on September 28, 2013. A new theatrical anime titled Natsume's Book of Friends: The Waking Rock and the Strange Visitor premiered on January 16, 2021. The film is composed of two stories, "Ishi Okoshi" and "Ayashiki Raihōsha". The main staff and cast members from the previous film are returning to reprise their roles with the addition of Hisako Kanemoto as a guest-star.

Separate soundtrack albums for the two seasons were released in Japan by Sony Music on September 24, 2008 and March 18, 2009, respectively. The series opening and closing theme songs were also released by Sony Music. As singles, "Issei no Sei" reached a peak rank of 48th on the Oricon singles chart, "Natsu Yūzora" reached 27th, and "Ano Hi Time Machine" reached 38th. "Aishiteru" was not released as a single, but instead included on an album called Uta no Hibi by Kourin (Also known as Callin').

ReceptionNatsume's Book of Friends'' was one of twelve finalists for the first Manga Taishō award in 2008.

Since the fifth volume of the series, the individual volumes have made the best-seller list for manga in Japan. Volume 5 was ranked at number 8 on the charts for the week of March 4–10, 2008; Volume 6 was number 5 for the week of July 8–14, 2008; Volume 13 has done the best so far of the volumes, staying on the chart for three consecutive weeks (number 2 for the week of January 2–8, 2012, number 4 for the week of January 9–15, 2012, then falling to number 19 the following week).

The anime has been popular not just in Japan, but also in the United States, Canada, South Korea, the Philippines, Taiwan, China, Vietnam, and Indonesia. Both the anime and the manga have been noted for their optimistic themes and presentation.

Notes

References

External links

Official Hakusensha manga website 
Official anime website 

2005 manga
2008 anime television series debuts
Aniplex franchises
Brain's Base
Hakusensha franchises
Hakusensha manga
Iyashikei anime and manga
Mystery anime and manga
Shōjo manga
Supernatural anime and manga
TV Tokyo original programming
Viz Media manga
Yōkai in anime and manga